Turritella apicalis is an extinct species of fossil sea snail, a marine gastropod mollusc in the family Turritellidae. These fossils are found in Florida.

References

Turritellidae
Pleistocene gastropods
Pleistocene animals of North America
Fossil taxa described in 1886
Gastropods described in 1886